is a Japanese manga series written and illustrated by Masaki Segawa. Based on the 1958 novel The Kouga Ninja Scrolls by Futaro Yamada, it was serialized in Kodansha's Young Magazine Uppers from 2003 to 2004. The story takes place in the year 1614. Two ninja clans, Iga of Tsubagakure and the Kouga of Manjidani, battle each other to determine which grandson of Tokugawa Ieyasu will become the next shogun. The deadly competition between 10 elite ninja from each clan unleashes a centuries-old hatred that threatens to destroy all hope for peace between them.

A 24-episode anime television series by Gonzo was broadcast in Japan from April to September 2005. Segawa continued producing serialized adaptations of Futaro Yamada's novels with The Yagyu Ninja Scrolls in 2005, Yama Fu-Tang in 2010 and Jū: Ninpō Makai Tensei in 2012. Additionally, a two-part novel sequel titled , penned by Masaki Yamada, was published in 2015 with illustrations by Segawa; a manga adaptation, illustrated by Tatsuya Shihira with character designs by Segawa, was serialized between 2017 and 2019, and an anime adaptation by Seven Arcs Pictures aired in 2018.

Basilisk won the 2004 Kodansha Manga Award for general manga.

Plot

At the dawn of Japan's Azuchi-Momoyama period (the late 16th century) two rival ninja clans, the Iga Tsubagakure and Kouga Manjidani, are engaged in a bitter blood feud that has spanned for centuries. The fighting finally ends when Hattori Hanzō the 1st succeeds in forging a cease fire between the two clans by conscripting both into the service of Tokugawa Ieyasu (the man who seized power to become Shogun and form Japan's first truly stable form of centralized government). Regardless, hostilities and bad blood remain between Kouga and Iga, ensuring a tenuous co-existence at best.

Fast forward to the year 1614; Ieyasu has retired from power (although he still wields considerable influence within the government) and passed the torch to his son Hidetada. Unfortunately, a succession dispute has risen concerning which of Ieyasu's grandsons are destined to take up the reins of power when their father finally decides to step down. The various government retainers are beginning to take sides and the Tokugawa Shogunate is on the verge of tearing itself apart.

In order to solve the problem before it spirals out of control, Ieyasu orders the no hostilities pact between Kouga and Iga canceled and promptly commands each clan to send 10 of their best ninja to enter a ruthless and bloody competition of kill or be killed. Each clan will represent one of the two factions supporting Ieyasu's grandsons; the names of their selected fighters recorded on two identical scrolls to be marked out in blood upon their death. The clan that slays the chosen ten of the other will be given favor for a thousand years while the grandson they represent will be pronounced the undisputed heir to the Shogunate.

Prior to the conflicts renewal, Kouga and Iga's two young heirs (Gennosuke and Oboro respectively) were betrothed to each other in the hopes that their union would finally dispel their clan's long-seated animosity toward each other. Forced headlong onto separate sides of a conflict they want no part of, Gennosuke and Oboro must now choose whether to kill the person they love or lead their entire clan to annihilation.

Publication
Written and illustrated by Masaki Segawa, Basilisk is based on the 1958 novel The Kouga Ninja Scrolls by Futaro Yamada. It was serialized in the seinen manga magazine Young Magazine Uppers from February 4, 2003, to June 15, 2004. The publisher, Kodansha, collected the individual chapters into five tankōbon volumes between April 30, 2003 and August 7, 2004. The manga was published in English by Del Rey Manga from May 2006 to May 2007, and then digitally by Kodansha USA in September 2014.

A sequel manga series, Basilisk: The Ouka Ninja Scrolls, based on a 2015 novel by Masaki Yamada, with character designs by Masaki Segawa and illustrated by Tatsuya Shihira, was published in Kodansha's Weekly Young Magazine from July 24, 2017 to April 8, 2019 and collected in seven volumes.

Anime

The first series (Basilisk: The Kōga Ninja Scrolls) premiered in Japan on the television stations TV Saitama, TV Kanagawa, Chiba TV, Mie TV, KBS, AT-X, Jidaigeki Senmon Channel, and others between April and September 2005.

The second series, Basilisk: The Ouka Ninja Scrolls, premiered in Japan on January 8, 2018. It is set 10 years after the original series and focuses on a group of young ninjas who endeavor to carry on the ninja traditions and techniques.

Notes

References

External links
Official Japanese website 
Official Basilisk broadband site  
Kodansha USA publishing page
Official Funimation website

2003 manga
2005 Japanese television series endings
2005 anime television series debuts
Anime and manga based on novels
Anime series based on manga
Battle royale anime and manga
Comics set in the 16th century
Cultural depictions of Oda Nobunaga
Del Rey Manga
Historical fantasy anime and manga
Funimation
Kodansha manga
Manga adapted into television series
Martial arts anime and manga
Ninja in anime and manga
Odex
Seinen manga
Seven Arcs
Winner of Kodansha Manga Award (General)